Tremonti is an Italian surname. Its meaning is "Three Hills". Notable people with this surname include: 

Anna Maria Tremonti (born 1957), Canadian journalist
Giulio Tremonti (born 1947), Italian Minister for Economy and Finance
Mark Tremonti (born 1974), American lead guitarist for the bands Alter Bridge, Creed
 Tremonti (band), a solo project by the above musician
 Thiago Tremonti (born 1985), Brazilian football player, currently playing for Pandurii Targu-Jiu